Prarthane is a 2012 Indian Kannada-language film directed by Sadashiva Shenoy , starring
Anant Nag ,  Prakash Raj and  Pavitra Lokesh in lead roles.

Plot

Cast

 Anant Nag 
 Pavitra Lokesh 
 Prakash Raj
 Sudha Murty
 Master Manoj
 Master Sachin
 Ashok
 B. C. Patil 
 Dinesh Mangalore
 Srinivas Prabhu

Music

Reception

Critical response 

B S Srivani from Deccan Herald wrote "The artwork and background score also add to the mood. Dialogues, co-written by J M Prahlad and the director himself, sometimes do stray towards turning preachy, but that’s it. Prarthane is a bold film in times of wanton neglect of legacies built with blood and sweat. Will those concerned hear this prayer though?" A critic from News18 India wrote "Veera Samarth gives a good background score for the film and the song "Jayabharathi" is soothing to ears. Camera work is average. Prarthane is a really good attempt and deserves to be encouraged". A critic from Bangalore Mirror wrote  "Sudha Murty makes a disastrous film debut. Her plea for Kannada medium schools, that forms part of the climax, is nothing short of a histrionic equivalent of hara-kiri. Unable to dub fluently, she makes a mess of her role. The main problem of the film is a weak script and even the background score which, at some places, sounds like the ‘bits’ inserted in seedy morning shows".

References

2010s Kannada-language films
2012 films